Büyükçekmece Dam is a dam on the Lake Büyükçekmece in Büyükçekmece district of Istanbul Province, Turkey. The development was backed by the Turkish State Hydraulic Works (DSİ), and was opened in 1988.

Büyükçekmece Dam was built to supply residential water to Istanbul. The construction started in 1983, and the dam was completed in 1988. Water supply from the dam's reservoir went into service in 1989. It is located in Büyükçekmece district on the European part of Istanbul on the Lake Büyükçekmece, which is formed by disconnecting the stream Sarısu's outflow to the Marmara Sea. It is an earth-fill embarkment dam of  height. The reservoir water is sanitated before it is supplied to the households.

See also
List of dams and reservoirs in Turkey
Water supply and sanitation in Istanbul

References

Dams in Istanbul Province
Dams completed in 1988
1988 establishments in Turkey
Water supply and sanitation in Turkey
Büyükçekmece